Yacine Kechout (born May 7, 1982 in Algiers) is an Algerian football player who is currently playing as a defender for MC Oran in the Algerian Ligue Professionnelle 1.

Honours
 Won the Algerian Second Division once with MC Alger in 2002
 Won the Algerian League once with JS Kabylie in 2004

References

1982 births
Algeria youth international footballers
Algerian footballers
Algerian Ligue Professionnelle 1 players
Living people
Footballers from Algiers
JS Kabylie players
JSM Béjaïa players
USM El Harrach players
MO Constantine players
MC Mekhadma players
MC Alger players
MO Béjaïa players
MC Oran players
Association football defenders
21st-century Algerian people